The Epistola ad Acircium, sive Liber de septenario, et de metris, aenigmatibus ac pedum regulis ('letter to Acircius, or the book on sevens, and on metres, riddles, and the regulation of poetic feet') is a Latin treatise by the West-Saxon scholar Aldhelm (d. 709). It is dedicated to one Acircius, understood to be King Aldfrith of Northumbria (r. 685-704/5). It was a seminal text in the development of riddles as a literary form in medieval England.

Origins
Aldhelm records that his riddles, which appear in this collection, were composed early in his career "as scholarly illustrations of the principles of Latin versification"; they may have been the work where he established his poetic skill in Latin. Aldhelm's chief source was Priscian's Institutiones Grammaticae.

Contents
The treatise opens with a verse praefatio ("preface") addressing 'Acircius', which is remarkably contrived, incorporating both an acrostic and a telestich: the first letters of each line in the left-hand margin spell out a phrase which is paralleled by the same letters on the right-hand margin of the poem, forming a double acrostic. This 36-line message reads "Aldhelmus cecinit millenis versibus odas" ("Aldhelm composed a thousand lines in verse").

After the preface, the letter consists of three treatises:
De septenario, treatise on the number seven in arithmology
De metris, treatise on metre, including the Enigmata (see below).
De pedum regulis, didactive treatise on metrical feet, such as iambs and spondees.

The Enigmata
The Epistola is best known today for including one hundred hexametrical riddles, which Aldhelm included for purposes of illustration of metrical principles. Among the more famous are the riddle entitled Lorica, and the last and longest riddle, Creatura. 

Aldhelm's model was the collection known as Symposii Aenigmata ("The Riddles of Symphosius"), and many of his riddles were directly inspired by Symphosius's. But overall, Aldhelm's collection is quite different in tone and purpose: as well as being an exposition of Latin poetic metres, diction, and techniques, it seems to be intended as an exploration of the wonders of God's creation. The riddles generally become more metrically and linguistically complex as the collection proceeds. The first eight riddles deal with cosmology. Riddles 9-82 are more heterogeneous, covering a wide variety of animals, plants, artefacts, materials and phenomena, but can be seen to establish purposeful contrasts (for example between the light of a candle in Enigma 52 and that of the Great Bear in 53) or sequences (for example the animals of Enigmata 34-39: locust, screech-owl, midge, crab, pond-skater, lion). Riddles 81-99 seem all to concern monsters and wonders. Finally, the long hundredth riddle is "Creatura", the whole of Creation. The Latin enigmata of Aldhelm and his Anglo-Latin successor are presented in manuscripts with their solutions as their title, and seldom close with a challenge to the reader to guess their solution.

Example
An example of an enigma by Aldhelm is his Elleborus, by which word Aldhelm understood not the hellebore, but woody nightshade. It is number 98 in his collection:

{| class="wikitable"
|-
! Latin original
! Literal translation
! Literary translation
|-
| style="width: 380px;" |
Ostriger en arvo vernabam frondibus hirtis
Conquilio similis: sic cocci murice rubro
Purpureus stillat sanguis de palmite guttis.
Exuvias vitae mandenti tollere nolo
Mitia nec penitus spoliabunt mente venena;
Sed tamen insanum vexat dementia cordis
Dum rotat in giro vecors vertigine membra.<ref>Ehwald, Rvdolfvs (ed.), Aldhelmi Opera, Monumenta Germanicae Historica, Auctorum Antiquissorum, 15, 3 vols (Berlin, 1919), i 144. Accessed from</ref>

| style="width: 380px;" |
 Purple-bearing, lo!, I was growing in a field/the countryside, with shaggy/rough/hairy foliage/stalks/branches
 similar to a shellfish/purple-fish/purple dye/purple cloth; thus with red murex/purple dye of my berry/red dye 
 purple blood drips/trickles from the vine-shoots in drops. 
 I do not wish to take away from the chewer the trappings of life, 
 nor will my gentle juices/poisons/potions utterly rob him of his mind; 
 but nevertheless a madness of the heart shakes/agitates/torments him, mad, 
 while, deranged by giddiness, he whirls his limbs in a circle.

| style="width: 380px;" |
 A purple flower, I grow in the fields with shaggy foliage. 
 I am very similar to an oyster: thus with reddened dye of scarlet 
 a purplish blood oozes by drops from my branches.
 I do not wish to snatch away the spoils  of life from him who eats me, 
 nor do my gentle poisons deprive him utterly of reason. 
 Nevertheless a certain touch of insanity torments him 
 as, mad with dizziness, he whirls his limbs in a circle.
|}

List of riddles

The subjects of Aldhelm's riddles are as follows.

Influence
Aldhelm's riddles were almost certainly the key inspiration for the forty riddles of Tatwine, an early eighth-century Mercian priest and Archbishop of Canterbury, along with the probably slightly later riddles of Eusebius and of Boniface. Two appear in Old English translation in the tenth-century Old English Exeter Book riddles, and Aldhelm's riddles in general may have been an inspiration for that collection.

Editions and translations
Ehwald, Rudolf (ed.). Aldhelmi Opera. MGH Scriptores. Auctores antiquissimi 15. Berlin, 1919. Scans available from the Digital MGH.Aldhelm: The Prose Works. Trans. Michael Lapidge and Michael Herren. D. S. Brewer, 1979.  .Aldhelm: The Poetic Works. Trans. Michael Lapidge and James L. Rosier. Boydell & Brewer, 1984. .
The Enigmata only
 The Riddles of Aldhelm. Text and translation by James Hall Pittman. Yale University Press, 1925.
 Through a Gloss Darkly: Aldhelm’s Riddles in the British Library ms Royal 12.C.xxiii, ed. and trans. by Nancy Porter Stork, Pontifical Institute of Mediaeval Studies, Studies and Texts, 98 (Toronto: Pontifical Institute of Mediaeval Studies, 1990). (A digital facsimile of the manuscript edited in this book is available here.)
 Saint Aldhelm's Riddles'' Translated by A. M. Juster, University of Toronto Press, 2015, .

References

Riddles
Latin poetry